The Green Dragon Tavern was a public house located on Union Street (then known as Green Dragon Lane) in Boston's North End. A popular meeting place for both the Freemasons and the Sons of Liberty, it was demolished in 1832.

History
The property had been inherited by Mehitable (Minot) Cooper from her uncle, William Stoughton, in 1701; Stoughton himself had acquired the property some time before June 1676. Valued at 650 pounds in 1705, the Green Dragon Tavern was purchased from her son, William Cooper, by physician and pamphleteer William Douglas in 1743. Douglas lived in the tavern, calling it his "mansion house". After his death in 1752, the tavern passed to his sister, who sold it to the St. Andrews Lodge of Freemasons in 1766. The Masons used the first floor for their meeting rooms led by Grand Master of the Grand Lodge of Massachusetts, Joseph Warren (killed at Bunker Hill), followed by Grand Master John Hancock. The basement tavern was used by several secret groups and became known by historians as the "Headquarters of the Revolution". The Sons of Liberty led by Samuel Adams, Boston Committee of Correspondence and the Boston Caucus each met there. Though membership in the Sons of Liberty was secret, it is widely believed to have included Samuel Adams, Dr. Joseph Warren, Paul Revere, John Hancock, James Otis, and Benjamin Edes (owner of the influential Boston Gazette). The Boston Tea Party was planned there and Paul Revere (a Mason) was sent from there to Lexington on his famous ride. In January 1788, a meeting of the mechanics and artisans of Boston passed a series of resolutions urging the importance of adopting the Federal Constitution pending at the time before a convention of delegates from around Massachusetts. The building was demolished in 1832. A warehouse was subsequently built in its place. On August 19, 1892, a commemorative plaque was placed:

Structure
The Green Dragon Tavern was located at Green Dragon Lane (today's Union Street) in Boston's North End. At  in size, it was one of the largest structures in Boston. Primarily composed of brick, the building had three floors in the back and two in front; greeting visitors was a copper dragon mounted on an iron crane.

Legacy

According to Steven D. Barleen in The Tavern (2019), "no tavern from this era (pre-revolution) is as famous or as important in American history" as the Green Dragon Tavern. A pub self-styled as the "new" Green Dragon Tavern is located in 11 Marshall Street in Boston's North End.

References

External links
 The Green Dragon Tavern, or Freemasons’ Arms
 "Historic Taverns of Boston" published in 2006 by G. Nathan
 BOOK (free complete copy on Wikimedia Commons here: Old Boston Taverns and Tavern Clubs, published in 1917

1697 establishments in Massachusetts
1828 disestablishments
Demolished buildings and structures in Boston
North End, Boston
Taverns in Massachusetts
Taverns in the American Revolution
Buildings and structures demolished in 1832
Former pubs